MCW Pro Wrestling (formerly known as Maryland Championship Wrestling) is a regional independent wrestling promotion based in Joppa, Maryland. It has regularly run events in the Mid-Atlantic region since the late 1990s.

History
Maryland Championship Wrestling (MCW) was originally established by wrestlers Dan McDevitt and Mark Shrader as an extension of the wrestling school Bone Breakers Training Center. MCW held its first card at Baltimore's Patapsco Arena on July 19, 1998, featuring Jerry Lynn, Devon Storm, Little Guido, Balls Mahoney, manager Jim Cornette and The Headbangers. During that event, MCW held a six-man match to crown the first ever Light Heavyweight Champion. The winner of the match was Shane Shamrock and due to his shooting death by police the following month, MCW named him as the lifetime Light Heavyweight Champion and replaced it with the Cruiserweight Championship.

Throughout the next year, the promotion featured veteran wrestlers such as Ricky Steamboat, Ricky Morton, Bobby Eaton, Tito Santana, The Iron Sheik, Sherri Martel, The Road Warriors, King Kong Bundy and Jerry "The King" Lawler, the latter two winning the promotion's heavyweight championship. Longtime mainstays such as Joey Matthews, Jimmy Cicero, Judas Young and Mickie James also began gaining popularity in the promotion.

On March 27, 2002, Steve Wilkos of The Jerry Springer Show made a one night appearance teaming with Gillberg to defeat The Slackers (Chad Bowman and Dino Devine) in a tag team match in Glen Burnie, Maryland; the 1,267 in attendance setting a new record for its home arena Michael's Eighth Avenue ballroom.

After holding its final card, The Last Dance: Shane Shamrock Memorial Cup, on July 16, 2003, MCW announced its intentions to merge with its longtime rival the Mid-Eastern Wrestling Federation. McDevitt and Shrader had originally left Mid-Eastern due to a business dispute with half its roster subsequently leaving for the newly established MCW. Although operations officially ceased in 2003, McDevitt continued holding occasional cards exclusively at Fort Meade under the "Fort Meade Wrestling" banner during the next several years before returning booking regular MCW events again.

MCW made Baltimore headlines in October 2006, with the booking of WIYY morning show personalities Kirk McEwen and Mark Ondayko as part of an eight-man tag match. Participating would have been a breach of their contract with their radio station, however, in the ensuing controversy, the longtime DJs left WIYY for rival WHFS.

On April 22, 2016, it was announced that the promotion was changing its name from Maryland Championship Wrestling to MCW Pro Wrestling.

Rage TV
The promotion also has a syndicated television show, Rage TV, which is also broadcast via the internet. Episodes of Rage TV have also been released on DVD.

In December 2000, local television producer Natasha Small filed a complaint to city officials in Bowie, Maryland in which she claimed she and her daughter had been subject to harassment stemming from a verbal confrontation with Rage TV host Jeff Jones during a television taping at the Bowie Community Television station on October 1, 2002. Although a written response by the city manager's office condemned both parties, no criminal or civil charges were filed against Jones or Maryland Championship Wrestling. Small's claims were supported by former studio director Milly Hall who had previously filed a complaint accusing Jones of using the studio to produce tapes for sale over the internet and what she described as "pornographic-like images" appearing on the show's official website. Maryland Championship Wrestling denied these charges however and, while city officials admitted the possibility of the promotion using the show to "assist a commercial venture", the city notified producers of new policy updates to guard against such assistance.

In April 2011, Rage TV taped shows at Duane "Gillberg" Gill's Professional Wrestling Academy in Severn, Maryland. The show was hosted by country music singer Mark Bray and Gill.

Shane Shamrock Memorial Cup
The Shane Shamrock Memorial Cup is an annual tournament held since 1999. The format of the tournament sees twelve wrestlers competing in six one-on-one matches, with the six winners advancing to an elimination match finale. The tournament is named in honor of Shane Shamrock, the inaugural MCW Light Heavyweight Champion who was shot and killed during an altercation with police officers in 1998.

When MCW closed its doors in 2003, an arrangement was made with Ring of Honor (ROH) that when ROH made its debut in the Baltimore area, it would carry on the tradition of the Shane Shamrock Cup. At ROH's The Last Stand, it was announced ROH would continue the Shane Shamrock Cup on June 24, 2004. In March, however, Rob Feinstein was forced to step down as owner of ROH. Less than a week before the tournament, Feinstein sold his share of ROH to Cary Silkin, causing Maryland promoter Dick Caricofe to pull out of the show. ROH was forced to move the show to Philadelphia and renamed the show Survival of the Fittest.

When MCW reopened in February 2006, it was announced that they were bringing back the Shane Shamrock Cup.

Shamrock Cup X (2010) 
MCW held its 10th annual Shane Shamrock Memorial Cup (branded as "MCW Shamrock Cup X") on July 31, 2010.

Shane Shamrock Cup (2013) 
The 13th MCW Shane Shamrock Cup was held on August 10, 2013.

Shane Shamrock Memorial Cup (2014) 
The 14th Shane Shamrock Memorial Cup was held on July 19, 2014 in Joppa, Maryland.

Shane Shamrock Memorial Cup XV (2015) 
The 15th annual Shane Shamrock Memorial Cup took place on July 18, 2015 at the MCW Arena in Joppa, Maryland.

Shane Shamrock Memorial Cup XVI (2016) 
The 16th annual Shane Shamrock Memorial Cup took place on July 16, 2016 at the MCW Arena in Joppa, Maryland.

Shane Shamrock Memorial Cup XVII (2017) 
The 17th annual Shane Shamrock Memorial Cup took place on July 14 and 15, 2017 at the MCW Arena in Joppa, Maryland.

Day 1

Day 2

Shane Shamrock Memorial Cup XVIII (2018)
The 18th annual Shane Shamrock Memorial Cup took place on July 13 and 14, 2018 at the MCW Arena in Joppa, Maryland.

Day 1

Day 2

Shane Shamrock Memorial Cup XIX (2019)
The 19th annual Shane Shamrock Memorial Cup took place on July 13, 2019 at the MCW Arena in Joppa, Maryland.

Shane Shamrock Memorial Cup XX (2021)
The 20th annual Shane Shamrock Memorial Cup took place on November 12, 2021 at the MCW Arena in Joppa, Maryland.

Shane Shamrock Memorial Cup XXI (2022)
The 21st annual Shane Shamrock Memorial Cup took place on July 23, 2022 at the RJ Meyer Arena in Joppa, Maryland.

Championships

Active

Retired

Shane Shamrock Memorial Cup winners

Hall of Fame
The MCW Hall of Fame is an American professional wrestling hall of fame. It was established in 2009.

Media
 MCW: Xtreme Measures II  DVD. Maryland Championship Wrestling, 2007.
 MCW: Shane Shamrock Tribute Show, 9/20/98.  DVD. Maryland Championship Wrestling, 2007.
 MCW: Aggravated Assault.  DVD. Maryland Championship Wrestling, 2007.
 MCW: Anniversary 2007.  DVD. Maryland Championship Wrestling, 2007.
 MCW: 6th Shane Shamrck Memorial Cup  DVD. Maryland Championship Wrestling, 2006.
 MCW: Guerrilla Warfare.  DVD. Maryland Championship Wrestling, 2006.
 MCW: Holiday Homecoming.  DVD. Maryland Championship Wrestling, 2006.
 MCW: March Madness.  DVD. Maryland Championship Wrestling, 2006.
 MCW: Monster Mash.  DVD. Maryland Championship Wrestling, 2006.
 MCW: Phenomenal Final Four.  DVD. Maryland Championship Wrestling, 2006.
 MCW: Red, White, Black & Bruised.  DVD. Maryland Championship Wrestling, 2006.
 MCW: Resurrection.  DVD. Maryland Championship Wrestling, 2006.
 MCW: Tribute to the Legends.  DVD. Maryland Championship Wrestling, 2006.
 MCW: Xtreme Measures.  DVD. Maryland Championship Wrestling, 2006.
 MCW: The Last Dance.  DVD. Maryland Championship Wrestling, 2003.

Further reading
"Wrestling, all pumped up The violent, adult themes of today's pro wrestling are a far cry from the cartoonish characters of the 1980s. Should parents let their kids watch?".  York Daily Record.  23 July 2001

References

External links
Maryland Championship Wrestling
Maryland Championship Wrestling at Facebook

 
American independent professional wrestling promotions based in Maryland
Companies based in Baltimore
Dundalk, Maryland
American companies established in 1997
1997 establishments in Maryland